2020 in professional wrestling describes the year's events in the world of professional wrestling.

The COVID-19 pandemic severely affected the professional wrestling industry worldwide in 2020. Many promotions cancelled or postponed booked events, with some being rescheduled for 2021. Other promotions, notably All Elite Wrestling (AEW) and WWE, instead held events behind closed doors. Other promotions began to follow suit as the year progressed. New Japan Pro-Wrestling (NJPW) was one of the first promotions to reintroduced live fans in the second half of the year with a limited capacity, followed by AEW.

List of notable promotions 
These promotions held notable shows in 2020.

Calendar of notable shows

January

February

March

April

May 

Notes

June

July

August

September

October

November

December

Shows affected by COVID-19
Due to the COVID-19 pandemic, many promotions canceled or postponed their events. Others, such as WWE and AEW, began presenting empty arena shows. WWE began this with the March 13 episode of SmackDown, airing the show from the WWE Performance Center in Orlando, Florida. Their following episodes of 205 Live and Monday Night Raw were also broadcast from the Performance Center; WrestleMania 36 and subsequent pay-per-views were also held at this venue until August. NXT broadcasts continued to be held at NXT's home base of Full Sail University in Winter Park, Florida, but also behind closed doors. AEW began this format with the March 18 episode of Dynamite, as well as that day's tapings for Dark, broadcasting from Daily's Place in Jacksonville, Florida, though after a couple of weeks at this venue, they moved to The Nightmare Factory, AEW's de facto training facility in Norcross, Georgia, though shows returned to Daily's Place in May. Since AEW's first broadcast under this format, they used their wrestlers and other employees to serve as the live audience in place of fans for matches in which the wrestlers were not performing. WWE similarly began doing this starting with the May 25 broadcast of Raw, using their Performance Center trainees as the live audience; the promotion further expanded this to friends and family members of wrestlers, beginning with the June 15 episode of Raw. Impact Wrestling began doing shows behind closed doors in April.

AEW then invited 60 selected fans (who were sponsors of the venue who could also invite friends and family) to their Fyter Fest event in July, following COVID-19 protocols, becoming the first to have fans, albeit select ones, to attend a professional wrestling event since the start of the pandemic. Beginning with the August 21 episode of SmackDown, WWE changed venues, with all future broadcasts of Raw, SmackDown, 205 Live, and PPVs being held in a bio-secure bubble called the WWE ThunderDome. WWE had nearly 1,000 LED boards to allow for rows and rows of fans to attend virtually for free—the ThunderDome was initially hosted at Orlando's Amway Center before moving to Tropicana Field in St. Petersburg, Florida in December (and then the Yuengling Center in Tampa, Florida in April 2021). In October, WWE moved NXT's shows, along with 205 Live, to the WWE Performance Center, which was redone as the Capitol Wrestling Center, NXT's version of the ThunderDome, though with a select few live fans also in attendance—the name was also an homage to WWE's predecessor, the Capitol Wrestling Corporation. In following COVID-19 guidelines, AEW became the first promotion to sell tickets for shows, but only to a 10–15% capacity of the Daily's Place venue. Fans were required to wear masks for the entirety of the shows with friends and families placed in their own pods distanced from other fans; the fans were also placed in the upper seating area of the open air venue. This began with the August 27 episode of Dynamite.

Postponed events
Many events were postponed to later dates as a result of the COVID-19 pandemic, with some being rescheduled to 2021.

Canceled events
The following events were canceled and not rescheduled as a result of the COVID-19 pandemic.

Notable events
February 27 – At WWE's Super ShowDown pay-per-view, the WWE SmackDown Women's Championship became the first women's championship to be defended in Saudi Arabia when Bayley defended the title against Naomi (which was only the second women's match contested in the country)
March 13 – WWE SmackDown is the first major wrestling show produced behind closed doors at the onset of the COVID-19 pandemic
June 17 – Independent wrestler David Starr was accused of sexual assault, sparking the Speaking Out movement in which several sex crime accusations were made against numerous wrestlers in major and independent promotions, resulting in the termination and/or suspension of many
July 1–2 – AEW's Fyter Fest is the first event to have live fans in attendance during the COVID-19 pandemic, albeit select fans (venue sponsors who were invited)
July 27 – CyberAgent founded CyberFight as the umbrella brand for DDT Pro-Wrestling, Ganbare☆Pro-Wrestling, Pro Wrestling Noah, and Tokyo Joshi Pro Wrestling. CyberFight was founded to oversee and promote the four individual promotions, similar to WWE's brand extension.
August 7 – NJPW Strong premiered on NJPW World and FITE TV
August 21 – WWE debuted the ThunderDome for their Raw and SmackDown brands, a virtual fan viewing experience used for TV shows and pay-per-views
August 27 – AEW Dynamite became the first major wrestling show to have ticketed fans in attendance during the COVID-19 pandemic (10–15% capacity of venue)
September 15 – Primetime Live premiered on FITE TV
October 4 – WWE debuted the Capitol Wrestling Center for their NXT brand, similar to the ThunderDome but with a small live crowd of select fans included
December 1 – NWA Shockwave premiered on YouTube

Accomplishments and tournaments

AAA

AEW

All Japan Pro-Wrestling (AJPW)

Big Japan Pro Wrestling

CMLL

Dragon Gate

DDT Pro-Wrestling

Impact

IWRG

Michinoku Pro Wrestling

MLW

NJPW

NWA

Pro Wrestling Noah

Pro Wrestling Zero1

ROH

WWE

Title changes

AEW

CMLL

Impact

IWRG

AAA

MLW

NJPW

NWA

ROH

The Crash

WWE
 – Raw
 – SmackDown
 – NXT
 – NXT UK
 – Unbranded

Raw and SmackDown
Raw and SmackDown each have a world championship, a secondary championship, a women's championship, and a male tag team championship.

NXT

NXT UK

Unbranded
These titles are not brand exclusive. The colors indicate the home brand of the champions (names without a color are former WWE wrestlers, Hall of Famers, or non-wrestlers).

Awards and honors

AAA

AAA Hall of Fame

Impact

Impact Hall of Fame

WWE

WWE Hall of Fame

Due to the COVID-19 pandemic, the 2020 WWE Hall of Fame ceremony was postponed and merged with the 2021 event. The Class of 2020 was inducted alongside the Class of 2021 at the 2021 ceremony. Listed here are the Class of 2020 inductees.

Debuts 
 February 11 – Mai Sakurai
 August 14 – Ami Sourei
 August 23 – Dominik Mysterio
 September 6 – Waka Tsukiyama
 October 8 – Bronson Rechsteiner
November 11 
 Colten Gunn
 Jade Cargill
 November 14 – Lady C

Retirements 

January 5
 Kevin Nash (1990–2020)
 Jushin Thunder Liger (1984–2020)
January 7 – Naoki Sano (1984–2020)
February 8 - Jimmy Valiant (May 5, 1964 – February 8, 2020) (wrestled one match in 2022) 
February 19 – Tiger Hattori (1978–2020)
February 22 – Manabu Nakanishi (1992-2020)
February 24 – Kagetsu (2008-2020)
February 28 – Gillberg (1990-2020)
May 15 – D-Von Dudley (1991–2020)
May 20 – Arisa Hoshiki (2011-2020)
 June 20 – C. W. Anderson (December 2, 1993 – June 19, 2020, returned to wrestling in 2021) 
 June 23 
 Sarah Logan (2011-2020, returned for an appearance at Royal Rumble (2022).)
 Saraya Knight (1999–2020)
June 29 – Ophidian (2007–2020)
July 16 – Bobby Fulton (1977–2020)
August 11 – Vanessa Kraven (2004-2020, returned to wrestling in 2022)
September 4 – Olímpico (1993–2020)
September 18 – Hiroe Nagahama (2014–2020)
October 12 – Erick Stevens (2003–2020)
October 24 – Mitsuo Momota (May 27, 1970 – October 24, 2020)
October 31 – Matt Tremont (2007–2020)
November 22 – The Undertaker (1987-2020)
November 28 – Jimmy Rave (1999–2020)

Deaths 

 January 5 – Charlie Cook (born 1941)
 January 9 – Pampero Firpo (b. 1930)
 January 11 – La Parka II (b. 1966)
 January 12 – Kazuo Sakurada (b. 1948)
 January 15 – Rocky Johnson (b. 1944)
 January 17 – Bobby Kay (b. 1950)
 January 19 – Steve Gillespie (b. 1963)
 January 23 – Hercules Ayala (b. 1950)
 January 25 – Justice Pain (b. 1978)
 January 28 – Carlos Rocha (b. 1927)
 March 5 – Rip Oliver (b. 1952)
 March 8 – Wayne Bridges (b. 1936)
 April 10 - Teijo Khan (b. 1956)
 April 12 – Joe Pedicino (b. 1949)
 April 16 – Howard Finkel (b. 1950)
 April 18 – Jack Lotz (b. 1933)
 May 6 – Supreme (b. 1970)  
 May 15 – Discovery (b. 1965) 
 May 17 – Shad Gaspard (b. 1981)
 May 23 – Hana Kimura (b. 1997)
 May 31 – Danny Havoc (b. 1986)
 June 4 – Matematico II (b. 1969)
 June 10 – Mr. Wrestling II (b. 1934)
 June 30 – Tim Brooks (b. 1947)
 July 25 – Z-Barr (b. 1982)
 July 27 – Crybaby Waldo (b. 1966)
 July 31 – Mark Rocco (b. 1951)
 August 9 – Kamala (b. 1950)
 August 16 – Xavier (b. 1977)
 August 27 – Bob Armstrong (b. 1939)
 August 30 – Ric Drasin (b. 1944)
 September 9 – Stevie Lee (b. 1966)
 September 10 – Barry Scott (b. 1955)
 September 21 – Jackie Stallone (b. 1921)
 September 22 – Road Warrior Animal (b. 1960)
 October 9 – Len Rossi (b. 1930)
 October 15 – Karsten Beck (b. 1986)
 October 17 – Principe Aéreo (b. 1994)
 October 20 – John Condrone (b. 1960)
 October 28 – Tracy Smothers (b. 1962)
 November 16 – The Bruiser (b. 1976)
 November 24 – Klaus Kauroff (b. 1941) 
 November 25 – Bob Ryder (b. 1956)
 December 2 – Pat Patterson (b. 1941)
 December 10 – Tom Lister Jr. (b. 1958)
 December 21 – Kevin Greene (b. 1962)
 December 24 – Dick Cardinal (b. 1927) 
 December 25 – Danny Hodge (b. 1932)
 December 26 – Brodie Lee (b. 1979)

See also 

 List of WWE pay-per-view and WWE Network events
 List of AEW pay-per-view events
 List of NJPW pay-per-view events
 List of Impact Wrestling pay-per-view events
 List of ROH pay-per-view events
 List of MLW events
 List of NWA pay-per-view events
 Speaking Out Movement
 WWE ThunderDome

References 

 
professional wrestling